Events in the year 2023 in Bulgaria.

Incumbents 
 President: Rumen Radev
 Prime Minister: Galab Donev

Events

February 
 17 February – Sofia lorry deaths: Eighteen people who have immigrated illegally from Afghanistan are found dead in an abandoned truck in Sofia City Province, Bulgaria. Thirty-five others are hospitalized. Four people have been arrested.
 26 February – One person is killed and 29 others are injured after a bus carrying migrants crashes near Chirpan, Stara Zagora Province,.

Sports 
 6 July 2022 – June 2023: 2022–23 First Professional Football League (Bulgaria)
 14 July 2022 – 3 June 2023: 2022–23 Second Professional Football League (Bulgaria)
 2022–23 Third Amateur Football League (Bulgaria)
 2022–23 Bulgarian Cup

See also 
 List of years in Bulgaria

References 

 
Bulgaria
Bulgaria
2020s in Bulgaria
Years of the 21st century in Bulgaria